Scottish Language Dictionaries (SLD), now Dictionaries of the Scots Language (DSL) is Scotland's lexicographical body for the Scots Language. DSL is responsible for the major Scots dictionaries, the Dictionary of the Older Scottish Tongue and the Scottish National Dictionary. Since 2004, all 22 volumes of these major texts have been available, free, via the internet, as the Dictionary of the Scots Language.

The organisation was formed in 2002 and continues the work of several generations of Scottish lexicographers. The current project team includes editorial staff from the Dictionary of the Older Scottish Tongue and from the Scottish National Dictionary Association.

In 2021, Scottish Language Dictionaries became an SCIO (Scottish Charitable Incorporated Organisation) and changed its name to Dictionaries of the Scots Language. It is a registered charity in Scotland with the OSCR number SC032910. DSL also undertakes a wide programme of educational work throughout Scotland, with people of all ages and abilities.

See also
 Dictionary of the Scots Language
 Dictionary of the Older Scottish Tongue
 Scottish National Dictionary

External links
 Dictionary of the Scots Language

Scots language
Charities based in Scotland
Companies based in Edinburgh
University of Edinburgh
Lexicography
Book publishing companies of Scotland
2002 establishments in Scotland
Companies established in 2002
Educational charities based in the United Kingdom